South Atlantic Steamship Company was the passenger and cargo founded in 1928 in Savannah, Georgia that ran the South Atlantic steamship Line. At the started by chartering foreign ships to run the lines in tramp trade. Later scheduled cargo services was added to the line. In 1958 the company was taken over by United States Lines. In 1961 United States Lines closed the Atlantic steamship line and renamed the Atlantic steamship line ships. US homes ports were: Jacksonville, Florida, Savannah, Wilmington, North Carolina and Charleston, South Carolina. Main foreign ports were: London,Liverpool and Manchester UK. At its peak, it operated 60 ships during World War II. During World War II the South Atlantic steamship line was active with charter shipping with the Maritime Commission and War Shipping Administration. During wartime, the South Atlantic steamship line operated Victory ships and Liberty shipss.

World War II
South Atlantic Steamship Company ships were used to help the World War II effort. During World War II South Atlantic Steamship Company operated Merchant navy ships for the United States Shipping Board. During World War II South Atlantic Steamship Company was active with charter shipping with the Maritime Commission and War Shipping Administration. South Atlantic Steamship Company operated Liberty ships and Victory ships for the merchant navy. The ship was run by its South Atlantic Steamship Company crew and the US Navy supplied United States Navy Armed Guards to man the deck guns and radio.

Ships

Some ships charted or owned by South Atlantic steamship line:

Victory Ships

Liberty Ships

John A. Treutlen
John Lawson 
John M. Brooke 
John M. Palmer 

John Sherman 
Johns Hopkins 
Telfair Stockton 
Theodore Dwight Weld, sank 1943 
Theodore Parker 
Thomas Hooker, sank 1943 
Thomas Say 

Thomas W. Murray 
, sank 
John A. Treutlen, sank

Others
 SS Shickshinny
 
 
 SS Fluor Spar
 SS Liberty Glo
 SS Magmeric
 SS Saccarappa
 SS Schoharie
 SS Shickshinny
 SS Southland
 SS Southport
 SS Southstar
 SS Southwind
 SS Sundance
 SS Tulsa
 SS Wildwood

See Also
World War II United States Merchant Navy

External links

 Liberty Ships built by the United States Maritime Commission in World War II

References

Defunct shipping companies of the United States
Transport companies established in 1928